Martiana clausa is a species of crab in the family Pseudothelphusidae, the only species in the genus Martiana.

References

Pseudothelphusidae
Monotypic arthropod genera